Ricky Ulric Bascombe Shakes (born 25 January 1985) is a professional footballer who plays as a winger for National League South club St Albans City. He has played in the Football League for Bristol Rovers, Bury, Swindon Town and Brentford. Born in England, Shakes represented the Trinidad and Tobago national football team once in a friendly, and thereafter has represented Guyana internationally.

Club career
Born in Brixton, Greater London, Shakes began his career at Bolton Wanderers in 2004, and made his debut in an FA Cup third-round replay against Tranmere Rovers in January 2004, scoring a last-minute equaliser to take the match into extra time. He failed to make a league appearance for Bolton, and after spells on loan with Bristol Rovers and Bury, joined Swindon Town in July 2005. Shakes made almost 70 league appearances in two seasons at Swindon but was released at the end of the 2006–07 season.

He joined Brentford in August 2007 after training with the club during the summer and scored a late goal on his debut in September 2007 to give Brentford victory away to Bury. However, after making 39 league appearances, he was released at the end of the 2007–08 season.

He joined Conference Premier club Ebbsfleet United in July 2008. In August 2010, it was reported that he was on trial with League Two club Stockport County, before re-signing for Ebbsfleet a few weeks into the season.

Having scored 11 goals in 46 matches for Ebbsfleet in the 2010–11 season, he added to that statistic by scoring eight goals in 45 appearances for the club during the 2011–12 season. On 29 June 2012, Shakes signed for Kidderminster Harriers. Shakes made 18 appearances for Kidderminster in the 2012–13 season, helping the club finish second in the Conference Premier.

On 3 July 2013, Shakes signed for Conference South club Boreham Wood. Shakes suffered a serious knee injury in pre-season training and was expected to be out for six months.

On 7 January 2021, Shakes signed for National League South side St Albans City.

International career
Shakes made his international debut in March 2006, coming on as a half-time substitute for Trinidad and Tobago in a 2–0 victory against Iceland.

In October 2011, Shakes was called up to Guyana for their 2014 FIFA World Cup qualifiers against Barbados and Bermuda. Originally, Shakes failed to meet FIFA's age regulations for changing international allegiance, however, Guyana won an appeal in 2010 which allowed him to do so. He made his debut for Guyana in a 2–0 away win against Barbados on 7 October 2011, before scoring his first goal four days later in a 1–1 draw with Bermuda.

Shakes' third international appearance came in the 2–1 victory over Trinidad & Tobago on 11 November 2011 which sealed Guyana's qualification to the third round of the 2014 FIFA World Cup qualifiers. In that game, Shakes scored the first goal and created the second for Burnley's Leon Cort, before Kenwyne Jones' consolation for Trinidad & Tobago.

Shakes was eligible to play for Trinidad and Tobago through his mother's heritage, and Guyana through his father's birth.

Career statistics

Club

International

International goals
As of match played 4 June 2016. Guyana score listed first, score column indicates score after each Shakes goal.

Honours
Swindon Town
Football League Two third-place promotion: 2006–07

Ebbsfleet United
Conference South play-offs: 2011

Boreham Wood
Conference South play-offs: 2015

References

External links

Ricky Shakes profile at the Boreham Wood F.C. website

1985 births
Living people
Footballers from Brixton
Citizens of Guyana through descent
Guyanese footballers
Guyana international footballers
Citizens of Trinidad and Tobago through descent
Trinidad and Tobago footballers
Trinidad and Tobago international footballers
English footballers
Association football wingers
Bolton Wanderers F.C. players
Boreham Wood F.C. players
Bristol Rovers F.C. players
Bury F.C. players
Swindon Town F.C. players
Brentford F.C. players
Ebbsfleet United F.C. players
Kidderminster Harriers F.C. players
St Albans City F.C. players
English Football League players
National League (English football) players
Dual internationalists (football)
Guyanese people of Trinidad and Tobago descent
Sportspeople of Trinidad and Tobago descent
Trinidad and Tobago people of Guyanese descent
English people of Guyanese descent
Sportspeople of Guyanese descent
English sportspeople of Trinidad and Tobago descent